Metal Industries, Limited was a conglomerate of mostly British engineering companies that operated from 1922 to 1970.

Metal Industries may also refer to:

Metalworking, the process of working with metals to create individual parts, assemblies, or large-scale structures
IMI plc, a British-based engineering company formerly known as Imperial Metal Industries
Sumitomo Metal Industries, a Japanese steel manufacturer